Clivina mustela is a species of ground beetle in the subfamily Scaritinae. It was described by Andrewes in 1923.

References

mustela
Beetles described in 1923